Kenneth Durden (born May 16, 1992) is an American gridiron football defensive back for the Montreal Alouettes of the Canadian Football League (CFL). He played college football at South Florida and Youngstown State. He was signed by the Oakland Raiders as an undrafted free agent in 2016.

College career

South Florida 
Durden originally committed to South Florida where he played there for only three years before transferring to Youngstown State.

Youngstown State 
Durden transferred to Youngstown State and played until he became eligible for the 2016 NFL Draft.

Professional career

Oakland Raiders
Durden signed with the Oakland Raiders as an undrafted free agent on May 10, 2016. He was waived by the Raiders on September 3, 2016, and was signed to the practice squad the next day. After spending the entire 2016 season on the practice squad, he signed a reserve/future contract with the Raiders on January 9, 2017.

On September 2, 2017, Durden was waived by the Raiders.

Tennessee Titans
On September 5, 2017, Durden was signed to the Tennessee Titans' practice squad. He was released on October 3, 2017.

New York Giants
On June 11, 2018, Durden signed with the New York Giants. He was waived on July 11, 2018, but was re-signed on July 29. He was waived again on August 3, 2018.

Tennessee Titans (second stint)
On August 11, 2018, Durden signed with the Tennessee Titans. He made the Titans opening 53-man roster on September 1, 2018, but was waived on September 15, 2018, but was re-signed three days later. He was waived on December 1, 2018, and re-signed to the practice squad. On December 18, 2018, after an injury to Logan Ryan, Durden was once again added to the active roster.

On August 31, 2019, Durden was waived by the Titans. On November 26, 2019, Durden was signed to the Titans practice squad. He signed a reserve/future contract with the Titans on January 23, 2020.

On September 5, 2020, Durden was waived by the Titans.

Montreal Alouettes
On March 9, 2022, Durden signed with the Montreal Alouettes. He played in seven regular season games in 2022 where he had 18 defensive tackles.

References

External links
Montreal Alouettes bio
Youngstown State Penguins bio

1992 births
Living people
American football cornerbacks
Canadian football defensive backs
Montreal Alouettes players
New York Giants players
Oakland Raiders players
People from Valdosta, Georgia
Players of American football from Georgia (U.S. state)
South Florida Bulls football players
Tennessee Titans players
Youngstown State Penguins football players